Backbone is the 33rd studio album by British rock band Status Quo. It was released on 6 September 2019 and debuted at number six on the UK albums chart, making it the band's 25th UK top ten album and their highest-charting album of original material since 1+9+8+2 (1982). Backbone also entered the Swiss album charts at number two, and the German album charts at number six, giving the band their highest album chart position in the latter country, despite a long history of enduring popularity.

Background
Backbone is the first album released by the band since the death of rhythm guitarist Rick Parfitt, who had featured on every prior Status Quo album. Speaking about the album in a press release, frontman Francis Rossi expressed both pride in the content and sadness regarding Parfitt's lack of involvement, saying "This new material had to be seriously good. Quo have achieved so much and meant so much to too many people for the quality to slip now [...] Losing Rick was hard to bear but, through Richie Malone, who was inspired to pick up a guitar by him, we can not only keep going but actually pick up the pace." He concluded: "I wasn't sure I had another album in me but I couldn't be more proud of Backbone."

The title track was released on 12 July 2019 as the first single, with a promo video. The second single, "Liberty Lane", was released on 9 August 2019 and a video for the single was later released in September. The band had started playing "Liberty Lane" and "Cut Me Some Slack" live a month before the album was announced, generating excitement for the new release, which is notable for being one of the few times the band have toured new music before release.

Track listing

Personnel
Status Quo
 Francis Rossi – lead guitar, vocals
 Richie Malone – rhythm guitar, vocals
 John "Rhino" Edwards – basses, guitars, vocals
 Andy Bown – keyboards, guitar, vocals
 Leon Cave – drums and percussion

Production
 Francis Rossi – producer, mixing
 Andy Brook – engineer, recording, mixing and mastering

Charts

Notes

References

2019 albums
Status Quo (band) albums